Faxonius sanbornii erismophorous is a sub-species of crayfish in the family Cambaridae. It is endemic to the United States.

References

External links

Cambaridae
Freshwater crustaceans of North America
Crustaceans described in 1962
Taxa named by Horton H. Hobbs Jr.
Taxa named by Joseph F. Fitzpatrick Jr.
Taxobox trinomials not recognized by IUCN